ISLISP (also capitalized as ISLisp) is a programming language in the Lisp family standardized by the International Organization for Standardization (ISO) and International Electrotechnical Commission (IEC) joint working group ISO/IEC JTC 1/SC 22/WG 16 (commonly termed simply SC22/WG16 or WG16). The primary output of this working group was an international standard, published by ISO. The standard was updated in 2007 and republished as ISO/IEC 13816:2007(E).  Although official publication was through ISO, versions of the ISLISP language specification are available that are believed to be in the public domain.

The goal of this standards effort was to define a small, core language to help bridge the gap between differing dialects of Lisp. It attempted to accomplish this goal by studying primarily Common Lisp, EuLisp, Le Lisp, and Scheme and standardizing only those features shared between them.

Design goals
ISLISP has these design goals:

 Compatible with extant Lisp dialects where feasible
 Provide basic functionality
 Object-oriented
 Design for extensibility
 Prioritize industrial needs over academic needs
 Promote efficient implementations and applications

ISLISP has separate function and variable namespaces (hence it is a Lisp-2).

ISLISP's object system, ILOS, is mostly a subset of the Common Lisp Object System (CLOS).

Implementations
ISLISP implementations have been made for many operating systems including: Windows, most Unix and POSIX based (Linux, macOS, FreeBSD, OpenBSD, NetBSD, Solaris, HP-UX, AIX, Cygwin, QNX), Android, DOS, OS/2, Pocket PC, OpenVMS, and z/OS.

Implementations for hardware computer architectures include: x86, x86-64, IA-64, SPARC, SPARC9, PowerPC, MIPS, Alpha, PA-RISC, ARM, AArch64

Two older implementations are no longer available:
TISL, by Masato Izumi and Takayasu Ito (Tohoku University), was an interpreter and compiler.
G-LISP, by Josef Jelinek, was a Java applet.

References

External links
ISLISP 2007 draft in PDF format
ISLISP 2007 draft in HTML format
ISLISP page of Kent M Pitman
ISLISP page of OKI ISLISP developers
ISLISP on Software Preservation Group

Lisp programming language family
Lisp (programming language)
Programming languages with an ISO standard